Terror Bass is a Burmese DJ and record production duo consisting of "Sai Htet Wai" and "Lwin Zin Ko Latt", founded by Sai Htet Wai in early 2015. As of now, Terror Bass have their own record label called Local Suicide Records (LSR) consisting of top tier Burmese Djs and music producers. Local Suicide Records (LSR) was founded by Sai Htet Wai as well.

Career 
The collaboration of Lil Jon, Skellism and Terror Bass's song called "In The Pit" was released in 2017 . And the Remix of Carnage (DJ)'s BTFWD song is 2.1 Million Views on YouTube. Terror Bass featured on "Holy Moly" with Carnage (DJ) in August 2019.
They got platinum plaque from billboard.

Discography

Singles 
 Holy Moly with Carnage (DJ)  
 In The Pit with Lil Jon and Skellism 
  Hard Sound with Lit Lords 
  Open For Fun with Idiots 
  No One Alive With Mashd N Kutcher
  Burmese Vibe

Remixes 
 Sellouts ft. Danny Worsnop  - Breathe Carolina
 BTFWD - Carnage (DJ) 
 A Chit Tha Chin - Sai Sai Kham Leng 
 Nout Sone Tot (Finally) - Super Models''

References

Living people
Burmese DJs
Year of birth missing (living people)
Electronic dance music duos